The Dutch Eredivisie in the 1992–93 season was contested by 18 teams. Feyenoord won the championship.

League standings

Results

Promotion/relegation play-offs
There was only one round in the promotion/relegation play-offs this year. Six entrants (four from the Eerste Divisie, two from this league) entered in two groups. The two group winners were promoted to (or remained in) the Eredivisie.

See also
 1992–93 Eerste Divisie
 1992–93 KNVB Cup

References

 Eredivisie official website - info on all seasons 
 RSSSF

Eredivisie seasons
Netherlands
1992–93 in Dutch football